Odostomia clavulina is a species of sea snail, a marine gastropod mollusc in the family Pyramidellidae, the pyrams and their allies.

Description
The shell grows to a length of 2 mm.

Distribution
This species occurs in the following locations:
 European waters (ERMS scope)
 United Kingdom Exclusive Economic Zone
 the Mediterranean Sea
 the Azores

References

External links
 To Biodiversity Heritage Library (4 publications)
 To CLEMAM
 To Encyclopedia of Life
 To World Register of Marine Species

clavulina
Gastropods described in 1877